The shadow blister effect is a visual phenomenon in which a shadow bulges (or blisters) as it approaches another.

The effect takes place when two objects are at varying distances between a non-point light source and a background upon which their shadows are cast. As the objects move transversely such that their shadows approach each other, the one nearest the light source begins blocking light from reaching the inside of the other object's penumbra, thereby expanding its umbra. This expansion of the further object's umbra continues until the umbras of both objects meet.

This effect can be demonstrated and understood using ray theory.

The shadow blister effect is commonly misconceived to be an illusion caused by the combining of the two object's penumbras, aided by factors such as diffraction, nonlinear response, and the eye's inability to differentiate between varying contrasts.

See Also
Black drop effect

References

External links
 Ray diagram of overlapping penumbra

Optical phenomena